Apos may refer to:
 Apostrophe, occasionally abbreviated to apos.
 Apos language, of Papua New Guinea
 Apoș, a village in Bârghiș, Romania
 Apoș River, a river in Romania
 APOS Music, a record label

See also 
 Apo (disambiguation)
 Aphos
 Apus (disambiguation)